Thorn EMI Computer Software was a British video games software house set up in the early 1980s as part of the now-defunct British conglomerate Thorn EMI. They released a number of games in the early 1980s, initially for the Atari 8-bit family, and later for the ZX Spectrum, Commodore 64 and VIC-20 computers. In 1984, the Thorn EMI name was dropped in favour of Creative Sparks as the company were reportedly unhappy with their image in the video games market. A budget label, Sparklers, was created in early 1985 to publish titles at £2.50. Later in 1985, Creative Sparks, Sparklers and the distribution company, Creative Sparks Distribution (CSD) gained independence from Thorn EMI after a management buyout.

In July 1987, six months after buying software company Mikro-Gen for a "substantial" sum,
Creative Sparks went into receivership with debts estimated at up to £1.5million.

The back catalogue of the company was acquired by Tynesoft, Alternative Software and Maynard International (Top Ten Software).
The former management at CSD went on to form Software Publishing Associates, owners of the Crysys and Pirate Software labels.

Video games released

on the Thorn EMI label:

 Blockade Runner
 Carnival Massacre
 Gold Rush
 Home Financial Management
 Orc Attack
 River Rescue
 Road Racer
 Submarine Commander
 The VIC Music Composer
 Tower of Evil
 Volcanic Planet

on the Creative Sparks label:

 Black Hawk
 Computer War
 Countdown to Meltdown
 Danger Mouse In Double Trouble
 Danger Mouse In The Black Forest Chateau
 Delta Wing
 Snodgits
 Special Delivery
 Stagecoach
 Story House
 Tower of Evil
 Danger Mouse in Making Whoopee

on the Sparklers label:

 Bargain Basement
 Desert Burner
 Doombase
 Quackshot
 St Crippens

References

Defunct video game companies of the United Kingdom